Junaid Cassiem (born 3 October 1993) is a South African former cricketer. He played in nine first-class and three List A matches for Boland from 2015 to 2017.

See also
 List of Boland representative cricketers

References

External links
 

1993 births
Living people
South African cricketers
Boland cricketers
People from Wellington, Western Cape
Cricketers from the Western Cape